North, Central American and Caribbean Junior records in athletics are the best marks set in an event by an athlete who has not yet reached their 20th birthday in the given year of competition, competing for a member nation of the North American, Central American and Caribbean Athletic Association (NACAC). NACAC doesn't maintain an official list for such performances. All bests shown on this list are tracked by statisticians not officially sanctioned by the governing body.

Outdoor

Men

Women

Mixed

Indoor

Men

Women

Notes

References

External links

NACAC Junior
NACAC